Notable people named Schottky include:

 Ernst Max Schottky, botanist
 Walter H. Schottky, physicist
 Friedrich Schottky, mathematician
Other links:

 Schottky diode and Schottky barrier in electronics and physics
 Schottky transistor in electronics
 Schottky group in mathematics
 Schottky defect in condensed matter physics
 Schottky anomaly in condensed matter physics
 Schottky noise in electronics, described mathematically by Walter H. Schottky, and also known as shot noise